Wuhu South railway station is a railway station in Yijiang District, Wuhu, Anhui, China.

History 
This railway station opened on 6 December 2015 with the Nanjing–Anqing intercity railway. It was originally called Yijiang railway station named after the Yijiang District. From 25 June 2020, the station has been known as Wuhu South.

Monorail 
An interchange with Line 1 of Wuhu Rail Transit opened on November 3, 2021.

References 

Railway stations in Anhui
Railway stations in China opened in 2015